State Route 260 (SR 260) is a  west–east state highway located in the northern part of the U.S. state of Georgia. Its route is entirely within DeKalb County. It is known as the shortest state route in Georgia.

Route description
SR 260 begins at an intersection with US 23/SR 42 (Moreland Avenue SE) in Atlanta. The route makes a beeline to the east to meet its eastern terminus, an interchange with I-20 just east of Atlanta.

The route is a mostly urban route, passing mostly businesses, churches, and schools. At its eastern terminus is DeKalb Memorial Park.

No section of SR 260 is part of the National Highway System, a system of routes determined to be the most important for the nation's economy, mobility and defense.

History
SR 260 was established in 1949 on a routing that had the same western terminus at US 23/SR 42, but went further to the east, to an intersection with SR 12. At that time, the entire route was paved.

Major intersections

See also

References

External links

260
Transportation in DeKalb County, Georgia
Roads in Atlanta